Maharana Pratap University of Agriculture and Technology is situated in Udaipur city of Rajasthan state in India. The government of Rajasthan founded this university by the bifurcation of Rajasthan Agriculture University, Bikaner on 1 November 1999. Since then it has been the principal academic institution supporting mainly south and south-eastern parts of Rajasthan, taking the national responsibility of identifying, designing, preparing and adapting new techniques in the field of production technology for agricultural development. Its jurisdiction is spread over 7 districts of Rajasthan: Banswara, Bhilwara, Chittorgarh, Dungarpur, Pratapgarh, Rajsamand, and Udaipur.

Apart from six constituent colleges, the university comprises Agricultural Research Stations, Agricultural Research Sub Stations, Livestock Research Station, Dry Land Farming Research Station and Krishi Vigyan Kendras.

Narendra Singh Rathore was appointed vice chancellor in 2019.

Constituent colleges 
The university comprises six constituent colleges:
Rajasthan College of Agriculture, Udaipur
College of Dairy & Food Technology, Udaipur
College of Technology & Engineering, Udaipur
College of Fisheries, Udaipur
College of community and applied sciences, Udaipur
College of Agriculture, Bhilwara

References

External links
 

Agricultural universities and colleges in Rajasthan
Universities in Udaipur
Memorials to Maharana Pratap
Educational institutions established in 1999
1999 establishments in Rajasthan